Plantibacter flavus is a bacterium from the genus Plantibacter which has been isolated from the phyllosphere of grass from Paulinenaue in Germany.

References

Microbacteriaceae
Bacteria described in 2002